

Places
Seabright, Nova Scotia
Sea Bright, New Jersey

People
Charley Seabright (1918-1981), American Football player from Wheeling, West Virginia
Paul Seabright, professor of Economics at the University of Toulouse, France
John Michael Seabright (born 1959), United States federal judge
Henry Seabright, magazine and children's book illustrator

Things
Seabright Lawn Tennis and Cricket Club
Sea Bright (boat)